Khandadash Madatov (born 14 March 1925) is an Azerbaijani athlete. He competed in the men's long jump at the 1952 Summer Olympics, representing the Soviet Union.

References

External links
 

1925 births
Possibly living people
Athletes (track and field) at the 1952 Summer Olympics
Azerbaijani male long jumpers
Olympic athletes of the Soviet Union
Sportspeople from Baku
Soviet male long jumpers